William Wild (21 February 1846 — 7 January 1891) was an English first-class cricketer. 

Wild was born in February 1846 at Thorncombe, Dorset. He later made a single appearance in first-class cricket for Hampshire against the Marylebone Cricket Club at Lord's in 1877. Batting twice in the match, he was dismissed for 8 runs by Fred Morley in Hampshire's first innings, while following-on in their second innings he ended Hampshire's innings of 149 all out unbeaten on 2 runs. As a bowler, he was described by the Hampshire Independent as a "Southampton lad, free and graceful delivery, [with] a good pace". Prior to playing first-class cricket for Hampshire, Wild was summoned to Southampton Police Court in October 1869 on charges of assaulting John Gray, a toll collector on the Itchen Bridge. Wild later moved to Norfolk, where he worked as a tailor. He died at his residence in Norwich in January 1891, with his wife informing the coroner that leading up to his death he had been suffering from rheumatic fever.

References

External links

1846 births
1891 deaths
People from West Dorset District
Cricketers from Dorset
English cricketers
Hampshire cricketers
British tailors